The following is a list of tours by American recording artist Ashlee Simpson. At the completion of her 2005, "I Am Me Tour", Simpson had sold 110,000 tickets.

Autobiography Tour

The Autobiography Tour was the first tour headlined by Ashlee Simpson, in support of her debut album Autobiography; the tour was successful with several dates sold out. The preparation for the tour was featured in Simpson's reality show The Ashlee Simpson Show, along with actual concert footage from the show in Los Angeles.  Simpson had six costume changes throughout the concert, and performed a covers medley along with an unreleased song, "Hollywood"

Opening acts
Pepper's Ghost
The Click Five

Setlist
This setlist is obtained from the February 16, 2005 performance at The Grove of Anaheim, in Anaheim, California. It does not represent all concerts during the course of the tour. 
"Autobiography"
"Nothing New"
"Love Me for Me"
"Shadow"
"Video Sequence"
"Harder Everyday"
"Undiscovered"
"Giving It All Away"
"Love Makes the World Go Round"
"Hollywood"
"Instrumental Sequence"
"Surrender (contains excerpts from "Celebrity Skin")
"Brass in Pocket" / "Call Me" / "Burning Up"
"La La"
Encore
"Video Sequence" 
"Pieces of Me"

Tour dates

Cancellations and rescheduled shows

I Am Me Tour

The I Am Me Tour is the second concert tour by American recording artist, Ashlee Simpson. The tour promoted her second studio album, I Am Me. After completing a series of concerts at various nightclubs, the tour officially started November 2005.

Opening acts
October Fall
Barefoot

Setlist
"I Am Me"
"Nothing New"
"Coming Back for More"
"Roses"
"L.O.V.E"
"Love Me For Me"
"Shadow"
"Autobiography"
"Catch Me When I Fall"
"Eyes Wide Open"
"Pieces of Me"
"Surrender"
"La La"
Encore
"Boyfriend"

Tour dates

L.O.V.E. Tour

The L.O.V.E. Tour (initially known as the I Am Me Summer 2006 Tour) is the third concert tour by American recording artist, Ashlee Simpson. The tour promotes the singer's second studio album, I Am Me. It is Simpson's biggest production to date.

Opening acts
The Veronicas 
Ashley Parker Angel

Setlist
I Am Me
"Boyfriend"
"Burnin Up"
"Nothing New"
"Autobiography"
"Shadow"
"Sweet Dreams (Are Made of This)"
"Eyes Wide Open"
"In Another Life"
"Catch Me When I Fall"
"Invisible"
"Beautifully Broken"
"Undiscovered"
"Say Goodbye"
"Love Me for Me"
"Coming Back for More"
"Why Don't You Do Right?"
"La La"
Encore
"L.O.V.E."
"Pieces of Me"

Tour dates

Festivals and other miscellaneous performances
Viejas Concerts in the Park
DuPage County Fair

Cancellations and rescheduled shows

Outta My Head Club Tour

Before the release of Simpson's third studio album Bittersweet World, Simpson embarked on her first club tour to promote the single "Outta My Head (Ay Ya Ya)". The shows lasted around 20 minutes, with between 3 and 4 songs performed. After the release of Bittersweet World, a 12-date summer tour was scheduled; however due to Simpson's pregnancy the tour was canceled.

Set list
 L.O.V.E
 Boys
 Murder
 Outta My Head (Ay Ya Ya)

Tour dates

References

Concert tours
Lists of 21st-century trips
Simpson, Ashlee